Hum Panchhi Ek Dal Ke is a 1957 Indian Hindi-language film starring Romi, Satish Vyas, Mohan Choti, Daisy Irani and Jagdeep in lead roles. It won the National Film Award for Best Children's Film.

Cast
 Romi as Rajendranath Mehra "Rajan"
 Satish Vyas as Nandlal "Nandu"
 Jagdeep as Mehmood
 Daisy Irani as Chatpat
 Mohan Choti as Guru
 B. M. Vyas as Rehman
 Marutirao Parab as Damu 
 Murad as Rai Bahadur Kailashnath Mehra 
 Achala Sachdev as Prema Mehra 
 David as Mirza Usman

Plot
Rajendranath Mehra, affectionately called "Rajan", by his parents and friends, is the only son of Rai Bahadur Kailashnath Mehra. He studies in a nearby school with Nandlal "Nandu", Mehmood, Chatpat, Guru and others. Once, Nandlal plans for an educational tour with his classmates. Rajan wants to go with them, which is not permitted by his angry father, because he doesn't like the friendship between his rich son and his poor classmates, but his mother helps him to go. The next morning, when his father is informed, he  is enraged, at first sends his servant Damu, to bring Rajan home, which he fails. Then his father sends his friend Mirza Usman for the same. When he also fails, his father decides to go fetch his son by himself. When his father goes in search, he is informed that children are back to their own homes. After returning home, Rajan's father forbids Rajan to go to school further, in lieu of, he places an ad for a private tutor for Rajan. A tutor is selected by his father, who is an ex-ringmaster. Rajan, with the help of his friend Chatpat, manages to go outside and meet with his friends as well as take part in a school drama. After a month, on the salary date of the tutor, Rajan's father discovers that his son has not taken any classes and it is his friend, who has given proxy for his son. Again enraged, he begins search for his son, which leads him to his friend Nandlal's house. He learns that Nandlal was injured, so his son is selling newspapers for their income. Then, he realises his mistake. He then decides for more facilities and entertainment for Rajan and his friends. At last, he accepts the friendship between Rajan and his friends.

Production 
Hum Panchhi Ek Dal Ke was directed by P. L. Santoshi, and produced by Sadashiv J. Row Kavi under AVM Productions. It was shot in Madras.

Soundtrack
The soundtrack was composed by N. Datta and lyrics written by P. L. Santoshi.

Accolades 
At the 5th National Film Awards, Hum Panchhi Ek Dal Ke won the National Film Award for Best Children's Film.

References

External links

1950s Hindi-language films
1957 films
Films scored by Datta Naik
Indian children's films
AVM Productions films